The Gentleman Usher of the Blue Rod is the Gentleman Usher to the Most Distinguished Order of Saint Michael and Saint George, established in 1818. If the office holder is female, she is referred to as the Lady Usher of the Blue Rod.

The office was simply designated as that of "Officer of Arms" to the Order from the first appointment in 1882 until 1911, when it received the present name.

Officers of Arms of the Order of St Michael and St George (1882–1911)
1882–1901: Frederick Obadiah Adrian, CMG
1901–1911: Sir William Alexander Baillie-Hamilton, KCMG, CB

Gentlemen/Lady Ushers of the Blue Rod (1911–present)
1911–1920: Sir William Alexander Baillie Hamilton, KCMG, CB
1920–1934: Sir Reginald Laurence Antrobus, KCMG, CB
1934–1959: Admiral Sir Alan Hotham, CB, CMG
1959–1972: Sir George Beresford-Stooke, KCMG
1972–1979: Sir Anthony Abell, KCMG
1979–1992: Sir John Moreton, KCMG, KCVO, MC
1992–2002: Sir John Margetson, KCMG
2002–2016: Sir Anthony Figgis, KCVO, CMG
2016–present: Dame DeAnne Julius, DCMG, CBE

References
Galloway, Peter The Order of St Michael and St George (London, Third Millennium Publishing, 2000) p. 365.

Order of St Michael and St George
Ceremonial officers in the United Kingdom